Pu Tuo Si Temple (also called as Puh Toh Tze Temple or Poh Toh Tse) is a Buddhist temple located off Tuaran Road in Kota Kinabalu, Sabah, Malaysia. The temple was built in 1980 with a statue of Guanyin located in the entrance. It is the main Chinese temple for the city. In 2013, the temple received a total of RM115,000 from the federal government to finance its on-going renovation.

Features 
The temple main hall is called Daxiong Baodian (大雄宝殿). At the main altar, there is a big statue of Buddha, with a statue of Guanyin in the left and Da Shi Zhi in the right.

References

External links 
 
  

Religious buildings and structures completed in 1980
Chinese-Malaysian culture
Buddhist temples in Malaysia
Buildings and structures in Kota Kinabalu
Tourist attractions in Sabah
Guanyin temples
20th-century Buddhist temples
20th-century architecture in Malaysia